The 1958-59 French Rugby Union Championship was contested by 56 clubs divided in seven pools of eight clubs.

The four better of each pool and the four better classified as 5th (for a sum of 32 clubs) were qualified for the final phase.

The Championship was won by Lourdes who beat the Béziers in the final.

Context 
The 1960 Five Nations Championship was won by France and by Ireland.

The Challenge Yves du Manoir was won by Mont-de-Marsan that beat the Béziers (9-9 the score but Mont de Maresan won for the number of tries scored)

Qualification round 

In bold the qualified to "last 32" phase

"Last 32" 

In bold the clubs qualified for the next round

"Last 16" 

In bold the clubs qualified for the next round

Quarter of finals 

In bold the clubs qualified for the next round

Semifinals 

The  Béziers because with the same number of point and tries, had a better number of penalties (1 –0, Pau score only a drop)

Final 

Lourdes team was renewed from the previous year because of the retirement of Maurice and Jean Prat, The farewell of François Labazuy (moved to Tarbes),  Henri Rancoule (to Touloun), Pierre Lacaze and Jean Barthe (to play rugby league). The departures was compensated by the arrivals of Michel Crauste and Arnaud Marquesuzaa and Roland Crancée.

Notes and References

External links
 Compte rendu finale de 1960 lnr.fr

1960
France 1960
Championship